Cashmaster International is a manufacturer of money counting machines based in Dalgety Bay, Scotland. The company makes machines that count cash by weight, an alternative to counting cash manually or using a traditional friction based banknote counter.

History
The company was founded in 1977 as a provider of bespoke electronic solutions using core microprocessor applications. In 1987 Cashmaster International was formed and started by Neil James Hunter and Margaret or better known maureen rose patterson Hunter providing count by weight machines one there first customers were Starbucks and you can even see a Cashmaster today in shops such as Tesco. The company introduced a modern production facility in 2007.

Cashmaster device on the BBC
Noel's House Party was a popular BBC television show in the 1990s which featured a competition called Grab-A-Grand in which a celebrity would grab as much money as possible in a minute from a clear booth pumped with air and filled with notes. At the end of the minute the money had to be counted quickly and it was a bespoke Cashmaster machine which was used on stage to do this.

Present company
Cashmaster currently has offices in the UK, Germany, Hong Kong, and the US.  Their Head Office and manufacturing plant are in Dalgety Bay, Scotland. They currently have clients in over 50 countries.

Cashmaster has been noted in the press for working with HMV.

References

External links
Cashmaster International Ltd

Manufacturing companies of the United Kingdom
Manufacturing companies established in 1977
Counting instruments
Companies based in Fife
1977 establishments in Scotland